Asta Kask is a Swedish punk band from Töreboda, Sweden. It was founded as "X-tas" in 1978, but changed to Asta Kask in 1980. In 1984 the band started working with Rosa Honung Records. After the 1986 release of the "Aldrig en LP" the band split up. In 1989 the band was reunited and played a few gigs, but went dormant until 1992 when they played at Rosa Honung's tenth anniversary. Quiet until 2003, they started touring again as "revenge" for all the unfairness they had been put through. The drummer, Bjurre, quit the band in late 2004 and was replaced by Dadde (of Wolfbrigade). During 2005 a growing conflict with Rosa Honung reached a point where the band instead signed a deal with Burning Heart Records. In April 2006, Asta Kask recorded their first album in 20 years. In 2013, the album Handen På Hjärtat was released on their new record label.

Despite singing in Swedish, the band have gained international reputation and their songs have been covered by acts from three continents. German punk rock band Rasta Knast started as a tribute band to Asta Kask.

Members
 Micke Blomqvist - vocals and guitar
 Ernie - bass
 Dadde - drums (since 2004)
 Bonta - vocals and guitar
 Bjurre - drums

Discography

EPs
1981 - För kung och fosterland
1983 - En tyst minut
1984 - Plikten framför allt
1986 - Än finns det hopp
2000 - Till sista droppen
2006 - Precis som far / Lilla Frida

LPs
1985 - Med is i magen
1986 - Live
1986 - Aldrig en lp
1990 - Sista dansen (Live)
2000 - Rock mot svinen
2007 - En för alla ingen för nån
2013 - Handen på hjärtat

CDs
1991 - Med is i magen
1991 - Aldrig en CD
1993 - Från andra sidan
1995 - Sista dansen
2003 - Kravallsymfonier 78-86
2006 - En för alla ingen för nån
2013 - Handen På Hjärtat

References

External links

 Official website

Swedish punk rock groups
Burning Heart Records artists